Stoney is an unincorporated community in Dickinson County, Kansas, United States.

References

Further reading

External links
 Dickinson County maps: Current, Historic, KDOT

Unincorporated communities in Dickinson County, Kansas
Unincorporated communities in Kansas